Nikola Matek (born 5 October 1990) is a Serbian football goalkeeper.

References

External links
 
 Nikola Matek stats at utakmica.rs 
 

1990 births
Living people
Footballers from Belgrade
Association football goalkeepers
Serbian footballers
OFK Beograd players
FK Srem Jakovo players
FK Metalac Gornji Milanovac players
FK Dolina Padina players
FK Bežanija players
FK Vršac players
Serbian First League players
Serbian SuperLiga players